Ewa Maria Janik (born 19 December 1948) is a Polish political figure who served in the national Parliament (Sejm) from September 1997 to November 2007. Ewa Janik served as a Mayor of Częstochowa from 1998 to 2000.

A native of the historic southern city of Częstochowa, formerly the capital of Częstochowa Voivodeship and, since 1999, a part of Silesian Voivodeship, Ewa Janik is a member of the Democratic Left Alliance and was initially elected to the Sejm in the Polish parliamentary election of 1997.  She was re-elected in 2001 and, in the election of 2005, received 6077 votes in Częstochowa district 28. She did not stand for re-election in 2007.

See also
Members of Polish Sejm 2005–2007

External links
Ewa Janik at the Sejm website (includes declarations of interest, voting record and transcripts of speeches)

1948 births
Living people
Members of the Polish Sejm 2005–2007
Members of the Polish Sejm 1997–2001
Members of the Polish Sejm 2001–2005
Democratic Left Alliance politicians
Women members of the Sejm of the Republic of Poland
People from Częstochowa
20th-century Polish women politicians
21st-century Polish women politicians
Mayors of places in Poland